Georgia Magree (born 25 January 1989), known professionally as GG Magree, is an Australian electronic music producer, DJ, and singer. Magree is originally from Sydney, Australia and now resides in Los Angeles, California.

Touring 
Magree has performed at many festivals and events around the world including: Hard (music festival) Red Rocks Amphitheatre, Ultra Music Festival, Electric Daisy Carnival and Lollapalooza.

While touring in early 2020 GG Magree contracted Covid-19.

Discography

Extended plays
 Dichotomy (2022)

Singles
 "One By One" (2017)
 "Bodies" (2018)
 "I Wanna Lose You" (2019)
 "Save My Grave" (with Zeds Dead and DNMO) (2020)
 "You Don't Know Me" (2020)
 "Flatline" (with Sullivan King and Kai Wachi) (2020)
 "Nervous Habits" (featuring Joey Fleming) (2020)
 "Loving You Kills Me" (2021)
 "Tear You Apart" (with Aaron Gillespie) (2021)
 "My Wicked" (2022)
 "Déjà Rêvé" ("Deja Reve") (2022)
 Already Dead (2022)

Features
 Zeds Dead, Nghtmre – "Frontlines" (2016)
 Jauz – "Ghost" (2017)
 LAXX – "Heart (2018)
Borgore, Axel Boy – "Reasons" (2018)
 Blanke – "Incinerate" (2019)

Remixes 
 Big Wild – "Heaven" (GG Magree Remix) (2019)
 GG Magree – "You Don't Know Me" (VIP Mix) (2020)

Filmography

Television

References

External links 

 

1989 births
Living people
21st-century Australian singers
21st-century Australian women singers
DJs from Sydney
Monstercat artists